The Ilford by-election of 25 September 1920 was held after the death of the Coalition Unionist Member of Parliament Sir William Peter Griggs. The Coalition retained the seat in the by-election.

Candidates
Fredric Wise, a stockbroker, was the Coalition Unionist candidate.
Joseph King was the Labour candidate. He was a former Liberal MP for North Somerset.
Major John William Howard Thompson was the Liberal candidate. He was a former MP for East Somerset.
British Pathe has newsreel footage of the three candidates standing outside their election count.
http://www.britishpathe.com/video/election-at-ilford/query/election

Result

Aftermath
Wise was re-elected at the following General Election when Thompson again stood, but this time, beat the Labour candidate into third place.

See also 
 List of United Kingdom by-elections (1918–1931)
1954 Ilford North by-election
1978 Ilford North by-election

References

Ilford by-election
Ilford,1920
Ilford by-election
Ilford,1920
Ilford,1920
1920s in Essex
Ilford